The 2020–21 Danish Superliga (officially the 3F Superliga for sponsorship reasons) was the 31st season of the Danish Superliga.  The season began on 11 September with reigning champions FC Midtjylland playing against the winners of the Danish Cup, SønderjyskE, losing 2–0 away from home. 

This season marked the first season with the video assistant referee (VAR) system.

Teams
Twelve teams competed in the league – the top ten teams from the previous season, the winner of the Relegation Playoffs and the champion of the 2019–20 Danish 1st Division. Lyngby BK retained its position in the Superliga by winning the Relegation Playoffs and Vejle BK joined the top flight after winning the 1st Division title.

Stadiums and locations

Personnel and sponsoring
Note: Flags indicate national team as has been defined under FIFA eligibility rules. Players and Managers may hold more than one non-FIFA nationality.

Managerial changes

Regular season

League table

Positions by round

Results

Championship round
Points and goals carried over in full from the regular season.

Positions by round
Below the positions per round are shown. As teams did not all start with an equal number of points, the initial pre-playoffs positions are also given.

Relegation round
Points and goals carried over in full from the regular season.

Positions by round
Below the positions per round are shown. As teams did not all start with an equal number of points, the initial pre-playoffs positions are also given.

European play-offs
The fourth-placed team of the championship round, AGF, advanced to a Europa Conference League play-off match against the winning team of the relegation round, AaB. The winners earned a place in the Europa Conference League second qualifying round.

European play-off match

Season statistics

Top goalscorers
As of 28 May 2021.

Top assists 
As of 28 May 2021.

References

External links
Superliga (uefa.com)

Danish Superliga seasons
Denmark
Superliga